Sordid Lives is a 2000 American independent romantic comedy film written and directed by Del Shores. The film tells the story of a Texas family coming together in the aftermath of the matriarch's death. The screenplay is based on the award-winning 1996 play of the same name by Shores.  According to the director's commentary DVD extra feature, it includes elements of his life.

Sordid Lives received mixed reviews from mainstream audiences, but became a cult classic with LGBT fans, particularly in the South. The film was followed by the 2008 television series Sordid Lives: The Series and the 2017 film A Very Sordid Wedding.

Synopsis
A colorful family from a small Texas town must come to grips with the accidental death of the elderly family matriarch during a clandestine meeting in a seedy motel room with her much-younger married neighbor. The woman's family must deal with their own demons while preparing for what could be an embarrassing funeral.

Cast and characters

Soundtrack

A Very Sordid Wedding
In Fall 2014, Del Shores announced that he was working on a sequel to the film titled A Very Sordid Wedding. Beard Collins Shores Productions launched an Indiegogo fundraising campaign to assemble the project and secure investor financing. The campaign ended on October 29, 2014, and filming for the sequel began in October 2015. The film premiered in Palm Springs, California, on March 10, 2017.

The film picks up 16 years after the events of the first film and deals with the impact of the advancement of same-sex marriage in the conservative Southern community. Several actors from the original Sordid Lives film reprise their roles, including Bonnie Bedelia, Leslie Jordan, Newell Alexander, Sarah Hunley, Rosemary Alexander, Ann Walker, and Kirk Geiger. Joining them from the Sordid Lives series are David Steen, David Cowgill, and Caroline Rhea.

Original actors Beth Grant and Olivia Newton-John turned down offers to return for the sequel. While Grant's role of Sissy was recast, Newton-John's role of Bitsy Mae was written out of the script. Shores also announced that several new actors would be joining the returning performers. In Spring 2015, Whoopi Goldberg was added to the cast as Ty's mother in-law.

Television series
Continuing the story, Viacom's Logo television channel produced Sordid Lives: The Series, consisting of 12 episodes. The television version begins at a point before that covered in the film, with Rue McClanahan as the mother, Peggy Ingram. Many of the film cast returned, including Leslie Jordan and Olivia Newton-John. Caroline Rhea replaced Delta Burke, and Jason Dottley replaced Kirk Geiger as Ty Williamson.

The series premiered on July 23, 2008, and ended after one season on October 29, 2008.

References

External links
 
 
 
 
 
 Sordid Lives at Wolfe Video
 Sordid Lives DVD review at DVD Talk

2000 films
2000 independent films
2000 romantic comedy films
2000s American films
2000 LGBT-related films
2000s English-language films
American films based on plays
American independent films
American romantic comedy films
American LGBT-related films
Lesbian-related films
Gay-related films
LGBT-related romantic comedy films
Transgender-related films
Films scored by George S. Clinton